Goalball tournaments have been staged at the Paralympic Games since 1976, after being demonstrated in 1972.

Medal winners

Men

Women

Medal table

Participating nations
Tables of both men's and women's competitions of participating nations who took part in goalball including rank classifications during the tournament. 
Key
- : denotes nation did not compete in that year.

X : denotes nation participated but didn't advance to the final rounds.

Q : denotes qualified for the next Paralympic Games.

Men

Women

See also

 International Blind Sports Federation
 World Goalball Championships

References 

 

 
Sports at the Summer Paralympics
Goalball competitions